Fred Tunstall (28 May 1897 – 21 July 1971) was an English football player and coach who played for Darfield St George's, Scunthorpe & Lindsey United, Sheffield United, Halifax Town, and Boston United, as well as the England national team.

References

Clarebrough, Denis (1989). Sheffield United F.C., The First 100 years. Sheffield United Football Club. .
Young, Percy A. (1962). Football in Sheffield. Stanley Paul & Co. Ltd .

1897 births
1971 deaths
Footballers from South Yorkshire
English footballers
England international footballers
Association football wingers
English football managers
Sheffield United F.C. players
Scunthorpe United F.C. players
Halifax Town A.F.C. players
Boston United F.C. players
Boston United F.C. managers
English Football League players
English Football League representative players
Sportspeople from Yorkshire
FA Cup Final players